The siege of Toyama was a battle during the Azuchi-Momoyama period (16th century) of Japan.

History 
During the late summer of August 1585, Toyotomi Hideyoshi had led his army of around 100,000 soldiers against Sassa Narimasa, one of his former allies many years back. 

Within the siege of Toyama, Toyotomi senior commander Maeda Toshinaga would play a very prominent role within the overall attack. In the end, however, Narimasa's defense was shattered, thus allowing the Toyotomi supremacy over Etchu province.

References

1585 in Japan
Toyama
Conflicts in 1585